Katherine "Kate" Chappell (December 19, 1985 – June 1, 2015) was an American film visual effects editor who worked on Game of Thrones. On June 1, 2015, she died after being attacked by a lioness in Johannesburg.

Biography
Chappell was born on December 19, 1985. She lived with her parents, Jonathan and Mary Elaine Chappell, two sisters and a brother in Westchester County, New York. She graduated from Hofstra University in Long Island. Chappell had lived in Vancouver since 2013. She was a visual effects editor of Game of Thrones, The Secret Life of Walter Mitty, Captain America: The Winter Soldier, Divergent, and Godzilla. Chappell was on the team that won a Primetime Emmy Award for the episode "The Children" in the fourth season of Game of Thrones.

Death
On June 1, 2015, Chappell was visiting Johannesburg's Lion Park when a lion lunged through the window of her vehicle, which she had opened to lean out and take photographs, against park rules, and bit her on the neck. Chappell died in Lion Park of her wounds before the paramedics arrived. Chappell was visiting South Africa to work on the conservation of wildlife, and was raising funds for Wildlife ACT, a conservation charity.

References

External links
 

1985 births
2015 deaths
Accidental deaths in South Africa
American film editors
Deaths due to lion attacks
People from Rye, New York